Aristida congesta (tassel three-awn, Afrikaans: Aapstertsteekgras) is a species of grass native to all provinces of South Africa as well as Namibia, Botswana, Eswatini, Lesotho, and Mozambique. The SANBI Red List classifies it as "safe."

SANBI mentions two subspecies:

Aristida congesta Roem. & Schult. subsp. congesta
Aristida congesta Roem. & Schult. subsp. barbicollis (Trin. & Rupr.) De Winter

It is a thick perennial tussock that grows 10–75 cm high. The leaves can be flat or folded. The plumes are 3–20 cm long. The spikelets have uneven husks. The upper portion is the widest, at 6.5–10 mm. It can be found on deciduous woodland on rocky slopes and weathered areas.

Grazing 

It has little value for grazing except when young:

References

congesta